Norths Landing is an unincorporated community in Randolph Township, Ohio County, in the U.S. state of Indiana.

History
Norths Landing was laid out in 1831. The community was named for the North family of settlers.

A post office was established at Norths Landing in 1866, and remained in operation until it was discontinued in 1919.

Geography

References

Unincorporated communities in Indiana
Unincorporated communities in Ohio County, Indiana